Bruce McLeod Gemmell (born 18 May 1950) is a former New Zealand rugby union player. He was educated at Auckland Grammar School where he was a member of the 1st XV between 1966 and 1968. A halfback, Gemmell represented Auckland at a provincial level, and was a member of the New Zealand national side, the All Blacks, on their 1974 tour of Australia and Fiji. He played six matches on that tour including two internationals. Gemmell retired from rugby in 1978 because of an ongoing head injury.

References

1950 births
Living people
Rugby union players from Auckland
People educated at Auckland Grammar School
New Zealand rugby union players
New Zealand international rugby union players
Auckland rugby union players
Rugby union scrum-halves